Susan R. Kilsby (nee Saltzbart, born 1958/59) is an American investment banker and businesswoman. She is the chairman of Shire.

Early life
A native of New Jersey, Kilsby was born circa 1958/59. She earned a bachelor's degree in Economics from Wellesley College and a master in business administration from the Yale School of Management.

Career
Kilsby began her banking career at First Boston in the 1980s. She spent most of her career as an investment banker, working for Bankers Trust, Barclays de Zoete Wedd and Credit Suisse. While at Credit Suisse she is known for having advised Coca-Cola and Fortune Brands.

In 2002 she became the first woman to head a mergers and acquisitions department of any major bank and held the position of co-chief-executive of European M&A until 2009. She gave up a part-time advisory role at Credit Suisse when she took on the role of chairing Shire.

Kilsby has been on the board of Shire since September 2011, and the chairman since April 2014. She became a non-executive director of BBA Aviation in April 2012, Fortune Brands Home & Security in July 2015, and the first female non-executive director at Goldman Sachs International in May 2016.

Personal life
Kilsby met her husband, Richard Philip Kilsby, when they were both managing directors at Bankers Trust. They married in 1994.

References

Living people
1950s births
Wellesley College alumni
Yale School of Management alumni
American investment bankers
American chairpersons of corporations
American women in business
American corporate directors
Goldman Sachs people
Businesspeople from New Jersey
21st-century American women